Sydenham High School is located about 20 minutes north of Kingston, Ontario in the village of Sydenham, Ontario adjacent to Loughborough Public School.  It is part of the Limestone District School Board.

History

Sydenham High School was first established in 1872 and proposed to serve the whole county. During the early years, it was called the Sydenham and Frontenac County Grammar School and managed by a County Board of Trustees. Each year the number of attending students increased until students from outside the county were required to pay fees so that the school could afford to hire a fourth teacher.

In 1927 the school hired its first bus from a private owner to service the Harrowsmith area. By 1947, it was clear the school building needed an expansion to accommodate its growing population, and by 1952 additions cost an estimated $17,000.

Sydenham High School continues to be a well-established rural institution that today services almost 1000 students. Following its motto "Spirit, Heritage, Success', the school continues to pride itself on its community and history.

Miscellaneous Information

Colours - Red and Gold
Mascot - Golden Eagle

Notable alumni
Jacob Dearbon, CFL player (Saskatchewan Roughriders) profile
Neil Puffer, CFL player (Edmonton Eskimos) profile
Mike Smith, NHL player (Edmonton Oilers) profile

External links
 School Website
 Athletics Website

High schools in Ontario
1872 establishments in Ontario
Educational institutions established in 1872